Inquisito is a French thriller television series set in the Middle Ages. It was created by Nicolas Cuche and Lionel Pasquier and produced by Septembre Productions It first aired on television on France 2 on 4

Season 1

List of Episodes 
 De viris  
 Docendi & iudicandi  
 Murus strictus  
 Dura lex sed lex  
 Hic Jacet  
 Aura popularis  
 Consensus omnium  
 Acta est fabula

Season 2 
France 2 has ordered a second season.
|-
| 7 and 8 || July 25, 2012 ||2.4 million
|}

Bibliography 
 Inquisitio, Nicolas Cuche, Robert Lafon, 2012

References

External links 
 
 

Inquisition
Serial drama television series